Galatta Ganapathy is a 2003 Tamil language comedy film directed by Karthik Kumar. The film stars Pandiarajan and Sanghavi, with Vennira Aadai Moorthy, Vinu Chakravarthy, Vadivukkarasi, Chitti Babu, Sethu Vinayagam, Keerthana, Pandu and Mahanadi Shankar playing supporting roles. The film, produced by R. Radhakrishnan, was released on 26 September 2003.

Plot

Ganapathy (Pandiarajan) and Veerappan (Chitti Babu) are police constables in a village, they force the shopkeepers and the criminals to give them bribes. Veerappan is married to the greedy wife Muthulakshmi (Lekhasri) while Ganapathy is a single man. Ganapathy's mother Annapoorani (Vadivukkarasi) earns a living by renting her brother's houses, her brother left her his fortune and vanished. Annapoorani is arrogant and greedy, she makes everyone's life a living hell. Her docile husband Sundaram (Vennira Aadai Moorthy) does any other sort of domestic work, her elder son Jagan (Jagan) is living away from his wife, Ganapathy has to give his entire salary to his mother and her daughter Abi (Sujibala) is afraid of her.

Ganapathy then falls under the spell of Nandhini (Sanghavi), who was new to the village. He even stalks her to reveal his love, Nandhini eventually reciprocates his love. During a mass-marriage function, organised by the police, Ganapathy is forced by his superiors to marry Nandhini. Ganapathy comes along with Nandhini following their wedding, Annapoorani asks a dowry of 5 lakh of rupees and Nandhini accepts to pay later. The next day, to everyone's surprise, Nandhini takes charge as a sub-inspector at the village police station, she is an honest and upright police officer who fights against bribery. Nandhini then files a dowry harassment case against her mother.

Thereafter, Nandhini confronts Annapoorani on multiple occasions. In the meantime, Sundaram left the home and decides to work as a cycle rickshaw puller. Abi (Sujibala) falls in love with her college mate Raja (Raja). Annapoorani then received money from the village bigwig Periyavar and tried to frame Nandhini for corruption, thus the anti-corruption bureau arrests Nandhini. One day, Annapoorani's brother (Sethu Vinayagam) comes back from pilgrimage and drives his sister out of his house. With her daughter, Annapoorani ends up on the street, Periyavar and his henchmen then kidnap her daughter. Nandhini and Ganapathy beat up Periyavar and his henchmen, and save Abi. Annapoorani then realises her mistakes. Therefore, Jagan gets back together with his wife, Abi marries her lover Raja, Sundaram comes back home while Nandhini and Ganapathy decide to finally consummate their marriage.

Cast

Pandiarajan as Ganapathy
Sanghavi as Nandhini
Vennira Aadai Moorthy as Sundaram
Vinu Chakravarthy as Pazhani
Vadivukkarasi as Annapoorani
Chitti Babu as Veerappan
Sethu Vinayagam as Annapoorani's brother
Keerthana as Jagan's wife
Pandu as Muthuramalingam
Mahanadi Shankar as Periyavar
Sempuli Jagan as Ekambaram
Bonda Mani as Sundar Raj
Lekhasri as Muthulakshmi
Jagan as Jagan
Raja as Raja
Sujibala as Abi
Vellai Subbaiah
Dhadha Muthukumar as Liquor Smuggler
Sivaram Gandhi
Benjamin
Vijay Ganesh
Junior Silk in a special appearance

Production
Vennira Aadai Moorthy, Chitti Babu and Pandu were selected to act in this comedy film, with Pandiarajan playing the role of a police constable. After pairing with Ravali in Anbu Thollai, Pandiarajan wanted to pair again with her but the film director Karthik Kumar had chosen Sanghavi to play the female lead role.

Soundtrack

The film score and the soundtrack were composed by Soundaryan. The soundtrack, released in 2003, features 6 tracks with lyrics written by Piraisoodan, Muthu Vijayan, Ilaya Kamban and Manipriyan.

References

2003 films
2000s Tamil-language films
Indian comedy films
2003 comedy films